"Nobody Does It Better" is a song by American singer-songwriter Nate Dogg, featuring vocals from rapper Warren G. It was released in June 1998 as the second single from Nate Dogg's debut studio album G-Funk Classics, Vol. 1 & 2 (1998). The song was produced by Warren G, and samples and contains an interpolation from "Let's Get Closer" by Atlantic Starr. The song was later sampled by rapper G Herbo in his song “No Jail Time” from his 2021 album “25”

Commercial performance 
"Nobody Does It Better", which became his biggest hit as a solo artist, peaking at number 18 on United States Billboard Hot 100 chart dated August 8, 1998.

Track listing 
CD Single
Nobody Does It Better (Radio Edit) (featuring Warren G) – 4:31
Nobody Does It Better (Album version) (featuring Warren G) – 4:31
Nobody Does It Better (Instrumental) – 4:31

Charts

Weekly charts

References

1998 singles
Nate Dogg songs
Warren G songs
Songs written by Snoop Dogg
Songs written by Nate Dogg
1998 songs